Isai is a 2015 Indian Tamil-language musical psychological thriller film co-produced, written, directed and composed by S. J. Suryah, making his comeback as a director after a 10-year hiatus since 2005. The film stars himself in the lead role with debutant Sulagna in a female lead and Sathyaraj as the main antagonist. The story is about the tiff between Vetriselvan (Sathyaraj) and A. K. Shiva (Surya), the two music composers in the film industry. The film marked the debut of S. J. Surya, as a music director, with cinematography handled by Soundararajan and editing by K. M. Riyas.

The project was announced on 2004, after the release of New, with other two projects, which failed to materialize, and the film went on floors from 25 May 2012. The film which is touted to be of a new genre musical-thriller, released on 30 January 2015, to positive reviews from critics and ended up with commercial success at the box office.

Plot
Vetriselvan (Sathyaraj) is an established and old-fashioned music director who is loved and respected for his works and is termed as the greatest musician of our times. A. K. Shiva (S. J. Suryah), who works as an assistant under Vetriselvan, gets an opportunity to compose music for a small-time film. When Shiva introduces new techniques and pioneers the use of synthesizers, his music gets the attention of all music lovers. Due to the freshness and modernity that his music possesses, he becomes the most sought after musician and overtakes Vetriselvan. Shiva becomes the number one musician and builds his own studio. Meanwhile, he falls in love with Jeni (Sulagna Panigrahi) and marries her. When it seems everything he touches turns to gold, Vetriselvan displays his true psychopathic form.

Vetriselvan decides to pull down Shiva by any means. Vetriselvan wants to disturb Shiva's peace of mind so that he could not concentrate on music. Vetriselvan enters into a deal with Shiva's car driver, manager, cook, and studio front office staff to get their help in bringing down Shiva. One day, Shiva's car driver parks the car amidst peak traffic and suddenly runs away, which confuses Shiva. He gets disturbed by the continuous honking sound. Shiva's manager also confuses him by giving some fake incidents which did not happen. Jeni gets conceived but gets aborted as Shiva's cook mixes some medicine in her food. Shiva is worried because of Jeni's miscarriage and cries aloud. He thinks that he is mentally disordered and goes to a mental hospital.

Shiva's strange behavior gets the attention of media, and his image is tarnished amid public. Vetriselvan feels happy seeing this and in the meantime, film directors start approaching him again. Vetriselvan thinks that his lost glory is recovered now. Finally, it is revealed that Jeni is none other than Vetriselvan's daughter who was sent by him so that he can accomplish his plan. Knowing this, Shiva gets furious and comes to kill Jeni. But she reveals that she has really fallen in love with Shiva for his kindness and she is conceived again now. Vetriselvan comes there and persuades to kill Jeni knowing that she really loves Shiva. In the meantime, Vetriselvan stabs Shiva with a knife.

Suddenly, Shiva wakes up, and it is revealed that the entire story was his dream. Madhu (Nila) (from Anbe Aaruyire) is now his wife, and she says that fans are eagerly awaiting for a movie as he has not made a movie in the last 10 years. Shiva says that he got a story from his dream and needs to decide the climax. The movie ends there.

Cast

Production
The project was announced by S. J. Suryah in 2004 shortly after the release of New, when he revealed that A. R. Rahman would also collaborate for three of his future ventures titled Anbulla Nanbane, Aezhumazhai vs Chitra with Silambarasan and Asin and Isai. While the first film released as Anbe Aaruyire in 2005, the latter two failed to progress. In January 2006, the film was reported to be back under way with either S. S. Chakravarthy or Navodaya Appachan being producer and it was suggested that the film would be about a "cunning assistant music director comes to the top". Other reports had also suggested that the film told the tale of the tensions between South Indian musicians Ilaiyaraaja and A. R. Rahman. However the failures of S. J. Suryah's films Vyapari and Thirumagan prompted Rahman reconsider his involvement in the project and subsequently opted out from the project in 2007.

In 2011, Suryah announced that the film would restart and he would compose the film himself, describing it as a "musical". Reports suggested that Lakshmi Rai, who had back to back successes in 2011 with Kanchana and Mankatha would play the female lead role but Suryah subsequently denied this stating that he had been auditioning newcomers in Mumbai for the role. In May 2012, the film's first look posters were finally revealed, with Sulagna Panigrahi, an Oriya and Indian television and film actress, who had made her Bollywood debut in the 2011 thriller Murder 2. The director confirmed that Prakash Raj, Ganja Karuppu and M. S. Bhaskar will feature in supporting roles. Prakash Raj left the project in January 2013 as a result of a busy schedule. Attempts to sign Gangai Amaren to replace him also proved to be unsuccessful. After a brief stall in the shoot, Sathyaraj was signed on to play the main antagonist, with Suryah confirming that the film would be based on a tiff between two music composers.

Themes and influences 
The film's plot is said to be inspired from certain real life incidents occurred in the lives of Ilayaraaja and A. R. Rahman even though it was denied by the director himself . The plot of the story is partially inspired from the Hollywood film The Truman Show.

Soundtrack

The music and background score of the film was composed by S. J. Surya, making his debut as a music director through this film. Think Music acquired the film's audio rights. The soundtrack album features eight tracks with three instrumentals; the songs were penned by Madhan Karky. A single from the film "Isai Veesi" sung by Chinmayi was released on 17 October 2014, and was positively received. The film's official tracklist was released on 27 October 2014. The soundtrack album was released at the office of Sun TV Network in Chennai on 31 October 2014, with the presence of actors Vijay and Dhanush. However, the album was released to public on 2 November 2014. The audio launch was aired on Sun TV on 9 November 2014.

The album received positive reviews from critics. Behindwoods rated the album 3 out of 5 stating "SJ Suryah should feel proud of his work in Isai!" Milliblog commented "SJ Suryah tries mighty hard, but his music is rough around the edges." "Isai Veesi" is based on Suryah's  "Ase Koni" from Ishq Wala Love (2014).

Release
After the announcement of the film, the makers unveiled the first look poster on 26 May 2012. The theatrical trailer of the film was released on 29 August 2014, coinciding with Vinayagar Chathurthi.

Initially planned for releasing on 1 May 2014, the same day were Ajith-starrer Vaali (1999) was released, The film was pushed to July 2014. The makers planned to release the film on 2 October 2014, coinciding with Gandhi Jayanthi. Later the film was scheduled to release on 30 January 2015. The film released in 300 screens across Chennai and Tamil Nadu which is the highest for S. J. Surya.

Reception
The film received generally positive reviews from critics as well as from audiences. The Times of India rated 3.5/5 stated But, there are times when the film turns frustrating as scenes go on and on, in convoluted fashion, with no end in sight. And with the climactic twist, which neither feels organic nor ingenious, Suryah only seems to be acknowledging that he couldn't come up with a satisfying end to the story he set originally out to film. All it does is give him a loophole to brush away the plot holes. Or, maybe, it his way of telling the whole world that SJ Suryah the director has literally woken up from his decade-long slumber. Deccan Chronicle rated 3.5/5 stated It is director Suryah's intelligently woven brave attempt that enthralls the audiences keeping them hooked to their seats.  Cinematographer Soundararajan should be lauded for capturing the right mood of the film with his alluring lighting compositions. A bit of trimming would have helped. Nevertheless, with Isai, Suryah sends out a strong message that ‘he is back with bang’!. Filmibeat rated 3/5, stated Physiological Thriller with good twist at the end. Indiaglitz rated 3/5 stated Minus these negatives, Isai is a grand comeback for SJ Surya without a doubt. Sathyaraj's role thumps the movie home.Twists, turns, Power packed acting minus music. The Hindu stated "I found Isai a better watch than the recent big-ticket movies we've been subjected to. It has to do with the plot, which gradually becomes so preposterous that the sheer whatever-next factor pulls you through. After a point, the film lurches madly between psycho-thriller, Victorian melodrama (think Gaslight), horror-movie staples, and — I kid you not — a meta musing on the director's long absence from the screen and his return to it. Whatever else, you have to hand him points for audacity. By the end, I was chuckling." Behindwoods rated 2.75/5 stated SJ Surya style glamour, humor, dialogues and power packed performances with a little twist in the end. "Desimartini" rated it 3.1/5. Rakesh Reddy of Desimartini described the movie as "SJ Suryah is back in business but Isai is not his best film. Isai has a raunchy 1st half and a lengthy 2nd half with an unexpected climax."

References

External links
 

2010s Tamil-language films
2015 films
2015 psychological thriller films
Films about classical music and musicians
Films about composers
Films directed by S. J. Suryah
Films set in psychiatric hospitals
Indian musical films
Indian pregnancy films
Tamil-language psychological thriller films